A prize crew is the selected members of a ship chosen to take over the operations of a captured ship. Prize crews were required to take their prize to appropriate prize courts, which would determine whether the ship's officers and crew had sufficient cause to have the value of the prize awarded to them.

In the Age of Sail and up into the American Civil War, capturing enemy ships was quite common. As a result, warships optimistically carried extra crew members for use as prize crews.  More recently, as evidenced by results of sea battles during World War I and World War II, ships generally were sunk, not captured. If, however, a ship is captured, a prize crew would be selected from the winning ship's complement.

Examples 
 See  for prize crew and prize court example.
 in 1939, SS City of Flint was captured by a German warship in the Atlantic and sailed to Norway. As Norway was neutral, the German prize crew were eventually interned and the vessel returned to her American owners.
 In 1941, a Royal Navy prize crew sailed the captured German U-boat U-570 from Iceland to the United Kingdom.
 At the end of World War II,  selected a prize crew to board the Japanese submarine .
  placed a prize crew on the Japanese Tachibana Maru at the end of World War II.
 U.S. Coast Guard cutters capture vessels during drug interdiction operations, and then bring them to port using prize crews.

See also 
 Boarding (attack)
 Prize (law)
 Prize Court
 Prize of war
 Prize money

References

External links 
 German prize crew of 22 sailed the ship into Hampton Roads, Virginia
 She hauled up and the captain sent over a prize crew
 He was a member of the prize crew that brought U-2513 back to the United States

Nautical terminology
Prize warfare